The men's team table tennis event was part of the table tennis programme and took place between August 13 and 18, at the Peking University Gymnasium. Teams consisted of three members. The sixteen teams were divided into four groups of four teams each, playing a round-robin within their pool. The top team in each pool advanced to the semifinals, with the second-place team from each group going to the bronze medal playoffs. The two semifinal winners met in the gold medal match, while the two semifinal losers each played against one of the winners from the bronze medal playoffs, with the winners of those games meeting in the bronze medal match.

Each match consisted of up to five games, with the first team to win three being declared the winner. The first two games in each match were singles, the third was doubles, and the final two were singles again. Each team member competed in two of the five games, according to a set rotation.

Qualification

Schedule
All times are China Standard Time (UTC+8).

Seeds
Team ranking list was produced on the basis of the ITTF July 2008 world ranking. Only the players qualified from each team were taking into consideration to establish the ranking. Teams were drawn into four groups on August 7. Injured or sick athletes could be replaced by alternates. The alternates could only compete in the team event, the replaced athletes were not allowed to compete again at the 2008 Summer Olympics.

Group round

Group A

Group B

Group C

Group D

Final stage

Bracket

Finals

Bronze medal playoff

Bronze playoff round 1

Semifinals

Bronze playoff round 2

Bronze medal match

Gold medal match

References

External links
 Table Tennis Official Results Book. Official Report of the XXIX Olympiad. Digitally published by the LA84 Foundation.
 2008 Olympic Games. International Table Tennis Federation.
 2008 Summer Olympics / Table Tennis / Team, Men. Olympedia.org

Table tennis at the 2008 Summer Olympics
Men's events at the 2008 Summer Olympics